The 2013–14 Seconda Divisione season is the thirty-sixth and final football league season of Italian Seconda Divisione since its establishment in 1978, and the sixth since the renaming from Serie C to Lega Pro.

It is divided into two phases: the regular season, and the playoff phase.

The league currently is composed of 36 teams divided into two divisions (Girone A and B) divided geographically.

The first eight teams in each girone, plus one team winning the relegation playoff round from each division will remain in Lega Pro. The last six teams in each girone, plus three relegation play-out losers from each division will be relegated to Serie D. In all, eighteen teams will remain in Lega Pro, and eighteen teams will be relegated to Serie D.

Start of season
Given a normal season where there are no team failures and special promotions, Lega Pro Seconda Divisione would feature 6 teams that had been relegated from Lega Pro Prima Divisione, 9 teams that had been promoted from Serie D, and 21 teams had played in Lega Pro Seconda Divisione the year before. Due to seven bankruptcies and non-admissions in Lega Pro Prima Divisione (one vacancy), Lega Pro Seconda Divisione (six vacancies) and Serie D (one vacancy: Sambenedettese of Girone F) the 2013–14 season is to feature only 2 teams that played in 2012–13 Lega Pro Prima Divisione, 13 teams that played in 2012–13 Serie D and 21 teams that played in 2012–13 Lega Pro Seconda Divisione. The league admitted seven teams to fill vacancies created. These teams are:
 Gavorrano which finished 15th in Lega Pro Seconda Divisione B, originally relegated for losing in the playoffs.
 Aversa Normanna which finished 17th in Lega Pro Seconda Divisione B, originally relegated for finishing at the penultimate place.
 Virtus Verona which finished 4th in Serie D Girone C, and was the playoff winner.
 Real Vicenza which finished 5th in Serie D Girone C.
 Casertana which finished 4th in Serie D Girone G, and was the playoff runner-up.
 Foggia which finished 5th in Serie D Girone H.
 Cosenza which finished 2nd in Serie D Girone I.
Also, SPAL was promoted through a merger with Giacomense.

Girone A

Teams
Teams from Emilia-Romagna, Liguria, Lombardy, Piedmont, Sardinia & Veneto

League table

Relegation play-off
only Finals winner remains in Lega Pro
other 3 teams are relegated to Serie D

Semifinals
First legs scheduled 18 May 2014; return legs scheduled 25 May 2014
In case of a tie in the aggregate score the highest classified team advances to the final.

Finals
First leg scheduled 1 June 2014; return leg scheduled 8 June 2014

Forlì remains in Lega Pro

Girone B

Teams
Teams from Abruzzo, Apulia, Basilicata, Campania, Lazio, Sicily, Tuscany & Umbria

League table

Relegation play-off
only Finals winner remains in Lega Pro
other 3 teams are relegated to Serie D

Semifinals
First legs scheduled 18 May 2014; return legs scheduled 25 May 2014

Finals
First leg scheduled 1 June 2014; return leg scheduled 8 June 2014

Tuttocuoio remains in Lega Pro

References

Lega Pro Seconda Divisione seasons
4
Italy